Ben Solomon may refer to:

 Ben C. Solomon (born 1987), American filmmaker and journalist
 Ben Zion Solomon, American-born Israeli musician
 Isaac Israeli ben Solomon (c.832–932), Arab Jewish physician and philosopher
 Joseph ben Solomon of Carcassonne (11th century), Jewish poet